Combstown is an unincorporated community in Surry County, North Carolina, United States, located on the outskirts of the city of Mount Airy, between Bannertown and Flat Rock.

Unincorporated communities in Surry County, North Carolina
Unincorporated communities in North Carolina